Westringia discipulorum, also known as white button bush, is a species of plant in the mint family that is endemic to Western Australia.

Description
The species grows as an erect shrub to 0.6–1.2 m in height. The flowers are white, appearing from September to October.

Distribution and habitat
The species grows on sandy soils in the Avon Wheatbelt and Mallee IBRA bioregions of Southwest Australia.

References

discipulorum
Lamiales of Australia
Eudicots of Western Australia
Taxa named by Spencer Le Marchant Moore
Plants described in 1921